Thornton House may refer to:

Places in the United States
Thornton House (Little Rock, Arkansas), listed on the NRHP in Arkansas
Albert E. Thornton House, Atlanta 	GA, listed on the NRHP in Georgia
Thornton Plantation, Pine Mountain, GA, listed on the NRHP in Georgia
Thornton House (Stone Mountain, Georgia), originally constructed circa 1790 in Union Point, Georgia
Thornton (Chestertown, Maryland), listed on the NRHP in Maryland
Matthew Thornton House, Derry Village, NH, listed on the NRHP in New Hampshire
Mansfield Thornton House, Warrenton, NC, listed on the NRHP in North Carolina
Thornton-Guise Kitchen And House, Munroe Falls, OH, listed on the NRHP in Ohio
Dr. Penn B. Thornton House, Houston, TX, listed on the NRHP in Texas

See also
 Thornton Hall (disambiguation)